A cherry bomb is a spherically-shaped firework.

Cherry bomb  may also refer to:

Film
 Cherry Bomb (film), a 2011 American action film
 Cherrybomb (film), a 2009 British drama

Music
 Cherry Bomb (album), 2015, by American rapper Tyler, the Creator
 Cherry Bomb (EP), 2017, by NCT 127
 "Cherry Bomb" (NCT 127 song)
 "Cherry Bomb" (John Mellencamp song), 1987
 "Cherry Bomb" (The Runaways song), 1976
 "Cherry Bomb" (Kylie Minogue song), 2007

Other
 Cherry Bomb (muffler), a brand of automotive exhaust systems
 Cherry Bomb (wrestler), Canadian professional wrestler Laura Dennis

See also 
 Cherri Bomb, a rock band from Los Angeles formerly signed to Hollywood Records
 Cherry Bombz, a 1980s British/Finnish rock band which consisted of members Anita Mahadervan (Toto Coelo), Terry Chimes, Andy McCoy and Nasty Suicide